Refugee Camp All-Stars was an American hip hop duo active in 1997, consisting of rappers John Forté and Canibus.

Despite releasing no studio albums under their own name, the group was heavily involved with Wyclef Jean's 1997 debut solo album Wyclef Jean Presents The Carnival. Their single, "Avenues", released on the soundtrack to the 1997 comedy film, Money Talks, became a Top 40 hit in the United States. The duo also released the single "The Sweetest Thing" featuring Lauryn Hill, on the soundtrack for the film Love Jones (1997).

Discography
Singles

1997: "Avenues" - #35 U.S.

References

Musical groups established in 1997
Musical groups disestablished in 1997
American musical duos
American hip hop groups
Hip hop duos